Andrew MacNaughton may refer to:

Andrew McNaughton, Canadian engineer and diplomat
Andrew MacNaughtan, Canadian music video director